Henri Antoine Jules-Bois (or simply Jules Bois; 29 September 1868, Marseille – 2 July 1943, New York), was a French writer with an interest in the occult.

He wrote Le Satanisme et la magie (Satanism and Magic). He was a noted friend of McGregor Mathers, the founder of the Hermetic Order of the Golden Dawn.

In a 1909 essay for The New York Times, Bois successfully predicted the rise of suburbia, the onset of gender equality and technical innovations such as a flying bicycle (though he overestimated its success).

References

External links
 Archive of his papers at Georgetown University

1868 births
1943 deaths
Writers from Marseille
20th-century French non-fiction writers
French occult writers
20th-century French male writers
French male non-fiction writers